Black Jimmy Pond, also known as Hyles Pond, is an  pond in the Cedarville section of Plymouth, Massachusetts. The pond is located northwest of Hedges Pond and northeast of Little Herring Pond. "Black Jimmy" was a resident at the house across the pond. During his residency he killed his wife. He then on the south side of the Pond set up a table and hanged himself. Today many witnesses have seen the ghost of "Black Jimmy's" wife in the Browning Lodge.

References

External links
Environmental Protection Agency
South Shore Coastal Watersheds - Lake Assessments

Ponds of Plymouth, Massachusetts
Ponds of Massachusetts